This list of the prehistoric life of California contains the various prehistoric life-forms whose fossilized remains have been reported from within the US state of California.

Precambrian
The Paleobiology Database records no known occurrences of Precambrian fossils in California.

Paleozoic

Selected Paleozoic taxa of California

 †Advenella
 †Agathiceras
 †Ampyx – tentative report
 †Ampyx
 †Apatolichas
  †Aspidella – tentative report
 †Aspidella terranovica
 †Atrypa
 †Atrypa reticularis
 †Aviculopecten
 †Aviculopecten occidentalis – or unidentified comparable form
 †Bimuria
 †Bolbolenellus
 †Bristolia
  †Bumastus
 †Calymene
 †Camarotoechia – tentative report
 †Carolinites
 †Chonetes
 †Cleiothyridina
 †Composita
 †Composita grandis – or unidentified comparable form
 †Composita subtilita – or unidentified comparable form
 †Conchidium
 †Conocardium
  †Cruziana
 †Cyclolobus
 †Cyclonema
 †Cymbidium
  †Daguinaspis
 †Dicoelosia
 †Didymograptus
 †Dimeropygiella
 †Diplichnites
 †Encrinurus
 †Endoceras – tentative report
 †Euomphalus
 †Fallotaspis
 †Favosites
 †Fenestella
 †Gogia
 †Halysites
 †Helicoplacus
  †Helicoprion
 †Helicoprion davisii
 †Heliomeroides
 †Hercynella
 †Holopea
 †Hyolithes
 †Illaenus
 †Ingria
 †Isogramma
  †Isotelus
 †Kawina
  †Kutorgina
 †Lingula
 †Lingulella
 †Lithostrotion
 †Lithostrotion pauciradiale
 †Lonchodomas
 †Meristella
 †Micromitra
 †Murchisonia
 †Neospirifer
 †Nephrolenellus
 †Nevadella
 †Obolella
  †Olenellus
 †Olenellus fowleri – or unidentified comparable form
 †Oryctocephalus
 †Oryctocephalus indicus
 †Paladin
 Palaeoaplysina
 †Paleochiton
 †Parafusulina
 †Paraschwagerina
  †Peachella
  †Pentamerus
 †Phillipsia
  †Phyllograptus
 †Plaesiomys
 †Planolites
 †Platyceras
 †Poleumita
 †Proetus
 †Pteridinium – tentative report
 †Raymondaspis
 †Remopleurides
 †Repinaella
  †Rusophycus
 †Schwagerina
 †Skenidioides
 †Spirifer
 †Spirifer brazerianus
 †Spiriferina – tentative report
 †Stearoceras
 †Streptosolen
 †Stylonema
 †Swartpuntia – or unidentified comparable form
  †Syringopora
 †Thompsonella
 †Trinodus
 †Trocholites – tentative report
 †Volborthella
 †Wanneria
  †Xenodiscus
 †Zacanthoides

Mesozoic

Selected Mesozoic taxa of California

 †Abyssochrysos – tentative report
 †Acanthoceras
 Acanthosphaera – tentative report
 Acesta
 †Acrioceras
  †Acrodus
 †Acrodus wempliae – type locality for species
 †Acteon
 †Acteonella
  †Aletopelta – type locality for genus
 †Aletopelta coombsi – type locality for species
 Amauropsis
 †Ampullina
 †Anagaudryceras
 †Anagaudryceras sacya – or unidentified comparable form
 †Anahamulina
 †Anasibirites
 †Anasibirites kingianus – type locality for species
 †Anatomites
 †Anatropites
 †Anisoceras
  †Anomia
 †Anoplophora – tentative report
 †Aphaea
 †Aphrosaurus
 †Aphrosaurus furlongi
  Aporrhais
 Architectonica – tentative report
 Arctica
 †Arctoceras
 Argyrotheca
 †Arnioceras
 †Arpadites
 Arrhoges
 †Aspenites – type locality for genus
 Astarte
  †Asteroceras
 †Atira
  †Augustynolophus
 †Augustynolophus morrisi
 †Axonoceras
 †Bacchites
  †Baculites
 †Baculites capensis
 †Baculites yokoyamai – or unidentified comparable form
 Barbatia
 †Barrettia
 †Basilemys
 † Belleza
 Bernaya
 †Beudanticeras
 †Bochianites
 †Bostrychoceras
 †Brancoceras
 Bulimulus
 Bullaria
 Bullina
 †Californites – type locality for genus
  †Californosaurus
 Callianassa – tentative report
 †Calliconites
 †Calliomphalus – tentative report
 Callista – tentative report
 †Calva
  †Calycoceras
 Cancellaria – tentative report
 Cantharus
 Capulus – or unidentified comparable form
 Cardinia
 Cardita
 †Cecrops
 Cerithidea
 Cerithium
 †Cidarina
  Cidaris
 †Clinura
 †Collignoniceras
 †Collonia
 Corbicula
 Corbula
 Cornutella
 †Cosmonautilus
  †Crioceratites
 Cucullaea
 †Cunningtoniceras
 †Cyclothyris
 Cylichna
 †Cylindroteuthis
 †Cymatoceras
  †Cymbospondylus
 †Cymbospondylus petrinus
 †Daonella – tentative report
 †Daonella dubia
 †Dentalium
 †Desmoceras
 †Desmophyllites
 †Dictyoconites
 †Didymoceras
 †Didymoceras hornbyense – or unidentified comparable form
 †Dieneria – type locality for genus
  †Discohelix – tentative report
 †Discoscaphites
 †Douvilleiceras
 †Durania
 †Echinocorys
 †Elimia
  †Enchodus
 †Entobia
 †Eriphyla
 †Eucalycoceras
 †Euclastes
 †Euomphaloceras
 †Eupachydiscus
 †Euspira
 †Eutrephoceras
 †Exiteloceras
 †Exogyra
  †Fagesia
 Fissurella – tentative report
 †Flabellina
 †Flabellum
 †Fresnosaurus – type locality for genus
 †Fresnosaurus drescheri – type locality for species
 Gastrochaena – tentative report
 †Gaudryceras
 †Gervillia
 Glans – tentative report
 †Glauconia
 †Globigerinelloides
 Glossus
 Glycymeris
 †Goricanites – type locality for genus
  †Grallator
 †Gryphaea
 †Gryponautilus
 Gyroidina
 Haliotis
 †Hauericeras
 †Hecticoceras
 †Hedenstroemia
 †Helena
 †Hemicidaris
 Heptranchias
 Hipponix
 †Homerites
  †Hybodus
 †Hydrotherosaurus – type locality for genus
 †Hydrotherosaurus alexandrae – type locality for species
 †Hypophylloceras
 †Ichthyornis
 †Ichthyosaurus
  †Inoceramus
 †Inoceramus balticus
 †Inoceramus cordiformis – or unidentified comparable form
 †Inoceramus incertus – or unidentified comparable form
 †Inoceramus naumanni
 †Inoceramus steinmanni – or unidentified comparable form
 †Inoceramus subundatus
 †Inoceramus teshioensis – or unidentified comparable form
 †Inoceramus turgidus – type locality for species
 †Inyoites – type locality for genus
 †Inyoites oweni – type locality for species
 Isognomon
  †Kallirhynchia
 †Kilianella
 †Kossmaticeras
 †Lacunaria
 Leda – tentative report
 Lima
 †Linearis
  †Lingula
 Lithophaga
 Lopha
 †Loxo
 †Lucina
 †Lysis
 †Lytoceras
 †Lytoceras batesi
 Macrocallista
 †Macrocephalites
 †Mammites – tentative report
 †Mantelliceras
 Margarella
 Margarites
  †Mariella
 Martesia
 †Mediaster
 †Meekoceras
 †Meekoceras gracilitatis
 †Melchiorites
 †Menuites
 †Merriamia
 † Mita – tentative report
 † Mita
  †Modiolus
 †Morenosaurus – type locality for genus
 †Morenosaurus stocki – type locality for species
 †Mortoniceras
 Musculus – or unidentified related form
 †Myophorella
 †Myophorella argo
 †Myophorella dawsoni – or unidentified related form
 †Myophorella yellowstonensis
 †Myophoria
 †Mytilus
 Natica
 †Navahopus
  †Nectosaurus
 †Neithea
 †Neocardioceras – tentative report
  †Neohibolites
 †Neophylloceras
 †Neophylloceras hetonaiense
 †Neophylloceras ramosum
 †Nerinea
 Nerita
 †Nolita
  †Nostoceras
 †Nostoceras splendidum
 Nucula
 Opalia
 †Ophiceras
 †Opis
 †Orthoceras
  Ostrea
  †Owenites
 †Owenites carpenteri
 †Owenites koeneni – type locality for species
 †Oxynautilus
 †Oxytoma
 †Pachydesmoceras
 †Pachydesmoceras pachydiscoide – type locality for species
 †Pachydiscus
 †Pachydiscus ootacodensis
 Panopea
  †Parapuzosia
 Patella – report made of unidentified related form or using admittedly obsolete nomenclature
 †Pecten
 †Pedalion
 †Pentzia
 †Peroniceras
 Phanerolepida
 Pholadomya
 †Phylloceras
 †Phyllopachyceras
 †Pinna
  †Plesiotylosaurus
 †Plesiotylosaurus crassidens
 Plicatula
  †Plotosaurus
 †Plotosaurus bennisoni
 †Plotosaurus tuckeri
 Polinices
 †Polycyclus
 †Polyptychites
 †Polyptychoceras
 †Posidonia
 †Potamides – tentative report
 †Proclydonautilus
  †Prognathodon
 †Prognathodon waiparaensis – or unidentified comparable form
  Propeamussium
 †Protocardia
 †Protrachyceras
 †Pseudomelania
 †Pseudoperna
 †Pseudothurmannia – tentative report
 †Pteraichnus
 †Pterotrigonia
 †Puzosia
 Pycnodonte
 Quadrans – tentative report
 Retusa
 †Rhaetina – tentative report
 †Rhynchonella
 Rogerella
 †Romaniceras
 †Scalarites
  †Scapanorhynchus
 Scaphander
 †Scaphites
 †Scaphites hippocrepis – or unidentified related form
 †Senis
  †Sequoia
 Serpula
 †Shastasaurus
 †Shastasaurus alexandrae
 †Shastasaurus pacificus
 †Shastoceras
 Siphonalia
 †Sirenites
 †Skolithos
 Solariella
 Solemya – tentative report
 Solen
 †Spiriferina – report made of unidentified related form or using admittedly obsolete nomenclature
 †Spiriferina coreyi – type locality for species
  Spondylus
  Squalicorax
 †Sturia
 † Suna
 †Tegula
 Tellina
 †Tenea
 Terebralia – tentative report
 †Tessarolax
  †Thalattosaurus
 Thyasira
 †Tollia
 †Tragodesmoceras
 †Trigonia
 †Trinacria
 †Trochactaeon
 Trophon
  †Turrilites
 †Turrilites acutus
 †Turrilites costatus – or unidentified comparable form
 Turritella
 Volsella
 †Worthenia
 †Wyomingites
 †Yezoites
  Yoldia
 †Zanola
 †Zealandites

Cenozoic

Selected Cenozoic taxa of California

 †Abantis
  Abies
 †Aboma
 †Acalypha
 Acanthina
 †Acanthina spirata
 Acanthocardia
 Acar
 Accipiter
 †Accipiter velox
  Acentrophryne
 Acer
 Acesta
 Acipenser
 †Acipenser medirostris – or unidentified comparable form
 Acmaea
 †Acmaea mitra
  †Acritohippus
 †Acritohippus isonesus – or unidentified comparable form
 Acteocina
 Acteon
 Actinemys
 †Actinemys marmorata
 Admete
 †Admete rhyssa
 Adula
 Aechmophorus
 †Aechmophorus occidentalis
  †Aelurodon
  †Aepycamelus
 †Aepycamelus alexandrae
 Aequipecten
 Aesopus
 Aethia
 Agaronia
 Agelaius
  †Agriotherium
 †Ailanthus
 Akera
 Alaba
 Alabina
 †Albicetus
 Alca
 †Alcodes
 Aleochara
 Aletes
  †Aletomeryx
 †Alforjas
 †Alisea – type locality for genus
 †Allodelphis – type locality for genus
 †Allodelphis pratti – type locality for species
  †Allodesmus
 †Allodesmus kernensis
 Alnus
 †Alopecocyon – type locality for genus
 Alopias
 †Alopias vulpinus – or unidentified comparable form
 Alvania
 Amara
 †Amara insignis
 Amauropsis
 Amelanchier
 Ammospermophilus
 †Amorpha
  †Amphicyon
 †Amphicyon ingens
  †Amphimachairodus
 Amphissa
 †Amphissa versicolor
 Amphiura
 †Amphora
 †Ampullina
 Amusium
 Anachis
 Anadara
 Anas
 †Anas americana
  †Anas clypeata
 †Anas platyrhynchos
 †Anchitheriomys – or unidentified comparable form
  †Anchitherium
 Ancilla
 Angulus
 Anniella
 Anodontia
 Anomia
 †Ansen
 Anser
 †Anser albifrons
 Antigona
 †Antilla
  Antilocapra
 Antrozous
 †Antrozous pallidus
 Aphelocoma
 †Aphelocoma californica
  †Aphelops
 Apiotoma
 Aplodontia
 †Aplodontia rufa
 Aquila
 †Aquila chrysaetos
 †Araeosteus
 †Araeosteus rothi
 Arbutus
 Arca
 †Arceuthobium
  †Archaeocyon
 †Archaeohippus
 Architectonica
 Archoplites
  †Archoplites interruptus
 Arcinella
 Arctica – tentative report
 Arctocephalus
  †Arctodus
 †Arctodus simus – type locality for species
 †Arctostaphylos
 Ardea
 †Ardea herodias
 Arenaria
 †Arenaria melanocephala
 Arene
 †Argenna
 Argobuccinum
 Argopecten
  †Argopecten gibbus
 †Argopecten purpuratus
 Argyropelecus
 †Artocarpus
 Asio
 †Asio wilsonianus
 Astraea
 †Astraea undosa
 Astrangia
 Astropecten
 Astyris
 Athene
 †Athene cunicularia
 Athleta
  †Atocetus
 †Atocetus nasalis – type locality for species
 Atrina
 †Aturia
 Atys
  †Aulophyseter – type locality for genus
 Austrotrophon
 †Avipeda
 Aythya
 †Aythya affinis
 †Aythya valisineria
 Baiomys
 Balaenoptera
 †Balaenoptera physalus
 †Balaenoptera ryani
  †Balaenula
 Balanophyllia
 †Balanophyllia elegans
 Balanus
  †Balanus crenatus
 †Balanus nubilus – or unidentified comparable form
 Bankia
 Barbarofusus
 Barbatia
  †Barbourofelis
 †Barbourofelis whitfordi
 Barleeia
 Barnea
 †Basirepomys
 Bassariscus
 †Bassariscus astutus – or unidentified comparable form
 †Bathylagus – type locality for genus
 Bathytoma
 †Bathytoma pacifica
 †Batodonoides
 Bembidion
 †Benoistia
 Beringraja
 †Beringraja binoculata – or unidentified comparable form
 Betula
 Bison
 †Bison antiquus
  †Bison latifrons
 Bittium
 †Bittium alternatum – or unidentified comparable form
 Bivetopsia
 †Boavus
  †Bolbocara
 Bolinichthys
 Bonasa
 †Bonasa umbellus
 †Bonellitia
  †Borophagus
 †Borophagus diversidens
 †Borophagus littoralis – type locality for species
 †Borophagus parvus
 †Borophagus secundus
 †Borophryne
 †Borophryne apogon
 Brachidontes
  †Brachycrus
 †Brachypsalis
 Brachyramphus
 Branta
 †Branta canadensis
 †Branta nigricans – tentative report
 Bubo
 †Bubo virginianus
 Buccinum
 †Buccinum strigillatum
 Bucephala
 †Bucephala albeola
 †Bucida
 Bufo
 Bulla
  †Bulla gouldiana
 †Bulla striata
 Bullia
 †Bumelia
 Bursa
 Buteo
 †Buteo borealis
  †Buteo jamaicensis
 †Buteo swainsoni
 Cadulus
 Caecum
 †Calicovatellus – type locality for genus
 †Calicovatellus petrodytes – type locality for species
 Calidris
 †Calidris alba
 Californiconus
 †Californiconus californicus
 Calliostoma
  †Calliostoma annulatum
 †Calliostoma canaliculatum
 †Calliostoma gemmulatum
 †Calliostoma ligatum
 †Calliostoma supragranosum
 †Calliostoma tricolor
 Callista
 Callorhinus
  †Callorhinus ursinus
 Calosoma
 †Calosoma semilaeve
  Calyptraea
 †Calyptranthes
  †Camelops
 †Camelops hesternus
 †Camelops minidokae
 Campanile
 Camponotus – type locality for genus
 †Camponotus festinatus – type locality for species
 †Canarium
 Cancellaria
 †Cancellaria obesa
 Cancer
 Canis
  †Canis dirus
 †Canis edwardii
 †Canis latrans
 †Canis lepophagus
 †Canis lupus
 †Canis rufus
 Canthon
 †Canthon praticola
 †Canthon simplex
 †Cantius
 †Capromeryx
  †Capromeryx minor
 Caracara
 †Caracara cheriway
 †Caracara plancus
 Carcharhinus
 Carcharias
 Carcharodon
  †Carcharodon carcharias
 †Carcharodon hastalis
 Carpelimus
 †Carpocyon
 Carya
 Caryophyllia
 Cassidulina
 Castanea
 Castanopsis
 Castor
 †Castor californicus – or unidentified comparable form
 Cathartes
  †Cathartes aura
 Catoptrophorus
 †Catoptrophorus semipalmatus
 †Catostomus
  Ceanothus
 Cedrela
 †Celastrus
 Celtis
 Cepphus
 †Cepphus columba
 Cercidiphyllum
 †Cercocarpus
 Cerithidea
 †Cerithidea californica
 Cerithiopsis
 Cerithium
 †Cernina
 †Cerorhinca
 Cervus
 †Cervus elaphus
  Cetorhinus
 †Cetorhinus maximus
  †Cetotherium
 †Chaenophryne
 Chaetodipus
 †Chaetodipus formosus – or unidentified comparable form
 †Chalcidichthys – type locality for genus
 Chama
 †Chamaecyparis
 Charadrius
 †Charadrius semipalmatus
 Chauliodus – type locality for genus
 Chelonia
 Chen
 †Chen caerulescens
  †Chendytes – type locality for genus
 †Chendytes lawi – type locality for species
 Chione
 †Chione californiensis
 Chlamys
 †Chlamys hastata
 †Chlamys rubida
  †Chlamys swifti
 Chlorostoma
 †Chorizanthe
 †Chrysobalanus
  †Chrysocyon
 †Chrysodomus – report made of unidentified related form or using admittedly obsolete nomenclature
 †Chrysolepis
 Cibicides
 Cicindela
 †Cicindela oregona
  Cidaris
 Cinnamomum
 Cissus
 †Citellus
 Citharichthys
 †Citharichthys stigmaeus
 Clathrodrillia
 Clathurella
 Clavilithes
 Clavus
 Clementia
 Cletocamptus
  Clinocardium
 †Clinocardium nuttallii
 Cliona
 Clupea
 Clypeaster
 Cnemidophorus
 †Cocconeis
 Cochliomyia – type locality for genus
 †Cochliomyia macellaria – type locality for species
 Codakia
  Colaptes
 †Colodon
 Coluber
 †Coluber constrictor
 Colubraria
 Columba – or unidentified comparable form
 †Columba fasciata
 Columbarium
 †Conasprelloides
 Concavus
  Conus
 †Conus fergusoni
 †Conus regularis
 †Conus scalaris
 †Cophocetus – tentative report
 Copris
 Coragyps
 Corbicula
 Corbula
  †Cormohipparion
 Cornus
 Coronula – tentative report
 Corvus
 †Corvus brachyrhynchos
 †Corvus corax
  †Cosoryx
  †Cranioceras
 Crassadoma
 †Crassadoma gigantea
 Crassispira
 †Crassispira montereyensis – or unidentified related form
 Crassostrea
 †Crassostrea ashleyi
 †Crassostrea titan
 Crataegus
 Crawfordina
 Crepidula
 †Crepidula adunca
  †Crepidula onyx
 Crepipatella
 †Crepipatella lingulata
 †Crommium
 Crossata
 †Crossata ventricosa
 Crotalus
  †Crotalus viridis
 Crucibulum
 †Crucibulum spinosum
 †Cryptocarya
 Cryptonatica
 †Cryptonatica affinis
 Cryptotermes
 Cryptotis
 Cucullaea
 Culicoides
 Cumingia
  †Cupania
 †Cupressus
 †Cupressus goveniana
 Cuspidaria
 †Cuyamacamelus
 Cyanocitta
 †Cyanocitta stelleri
 Cybocephalus
 †Cybocephalus californicus – or unidentified comparable form
 Cyclammina
 Cyclocardia
  Cyclothone
 Cygnus
 †Cygnus columbianus
 Cylichna
 Cymatium
 Cymatogaster
 †Cymatogaster aggregata
 †Cynarctoides
 †Cynarctoides acridens
 †Cynarctus
  †Cynelos
 Cynoscion
 Cyperus
 Cypraea
 Cyrtonyx
 Cystiscus
 Cythara
 Cytherea
 †Dalbergia
  †Daphoenodon – or unidentified comparable form
  †Daphoenus
 †Daphoenus ruber – type locality for species
 Dardanus
 †Dardanus arrosor
 Dasyatis
 Dasyhelea
 †Decapterus
 Deltochilum – tentative report
 Dendragapus
 †Dendragapus fuliginosus
  †Dendragapus obscurus
 Dendraster
  †Dendraster excentricus
 Dendrophyllia
 Dendryphantes
 Dentalium
 †Dentalium neohexagonum
 Dermochelys – or unidentified related form
 Deroceras
 †Desmatippus
 †Desmatochoerus
 †Desmocyon
 †Desmodium
  †Desmostylus
 †Desmostylus hesperus – type locality for species
 Diacria
  †Diceratherium
 Dichocoenia
 †Dinohippus
  †Dinohyus
 †Dinohyus hollandi
 Diodora
 †Diodora arnoldi
 †Diodora aspera
 †Diodora inaequalis
 Diomedea
 †Diospyros
 Diploria
 Dipodomys
 †Dipodomys agilis – or unidentified comparable form
 †Dipodomys compactus
 †Dipodomys deserti – or unidentified comparable form
 †Dipodomys heermanni – or unidentified comparable form
  †Dipodomys merriami
 †Dipodomys ordii
 †Dipoides
 †Diprionomys
 Discinisca
 †Discohelix
 †Dissacus
 Distorsio
 †Domnina
 Donax
 †Donax gouldii
 Dosinia
 †Dosinia dunkeri
 †Drimys – type locality for genus
 †Dromomeryx
  †Duchesneodus
 †Dusisiren
 Dytiscus
 Echinarachnius
 Echinorhinus
 Eclipes – type locality for genus
 †Ectasis – type locality for genus
 †Ectopistes
  †Ectopistes migratorius
 Eleodes
 †Eleodes osculans – type locality for species
 Elgaria
 †Elgaria multicarinata
  †Elomeryx
 †Enaliarctos
 †Enaliarctos mealsi
 †Enaliarctos mitchelli
 †Enallagma – type locality for genus
 Engelhardtia
 Engina
 Enhydra
 †Enhydra lutris
 †Enhydritherium terraenovae
 Ensis
 Entomobrya
 †Eomellivora
  †Eopelobates
 †Eosurcula
  †Epicyon
 †Epicyon haydeni
 †Epihippus
 Epinephelus
 †Epiphragmophora
 Epitonium
 Eptesicus
 †Eptesicus fuscus – or unidentified comparable form
 †Equisetum
 Equus
 †Equus idahoensi
  †Equus scotti
 †Equus simplicidens
 Eremophila
 †Eremophila alpestris
 Erethizon
 †Erethizon dorsatum
 †Eriquius
 Eschrichtius
 †Eschrichtius robustus – or unidentified comparable form
 †Etringus
 Eubalaena – or unidentified comparable form
 †Eucastor
  †Euceratherium – type locality for genus
 †Euceratherium collinum – type locality for species
  †Eucyon
 †Eucyon davisi
 Euleptorhamphus
 Eumetopias
 †Euoplocyon
 Euphagus
 †Euphagus cyanocephalus
 Euscelis
 Eusmilia
 Euspira
 †Euspira lewisii
 Eutamias
 †Eutrephoceras
 Euvola
 †Evesthes
 †Exilia
 Falco
  †Falco peregrinus
 †Falco sparverius
 Felis
 †Ficopsis
 Ficus
 Fimbria
  Fissurella
 †Fissurella volcano
 Flabellipecten
 Flabellum
 †Forestiera
 Forreria
 †Forreria belcheri
 †Fragilaria
 Fratercula
  †Fratercula cirrhata
 †Fratercula dowi – type locality for species
 †Fraxinus
 Fulgoraria
 †Fulica
 †Fulica americana
 Fulmarus
 †Fulmarus glacialis
 Fusinus
 †Fusinus barbarensis
 †Fusinus luteopictus
  Galeocerdo
 †Galeocerdo aduncus
 Galeodea
 Galeorhinus
 †Ganolytes
 Gari
 Gasterosteus
  †Gasterosteus aculeatus
 Gastrochaena
 Gavia
 †Gavia arctica
  †Gavia immer
 †Gavia pacifica
  †Gavia stellata
 Gemmula
 Genota
 Genyonemus
 †Genyonemus lineatus
 Geochelone
 †Geococcyx
  †Geococcyx californianus
 Geomys
 Geranoaetus
 Gerrhonotus
 †Gila – tentative report
 †Gilbertia
 Glans
 Glaucidium
 †Glaucidium gnoma
 Glebocarcinus
 Globigerina
 †Globigerina bulloides
 Globularia
 Glossus
 Glycimeris
 Glycymeris
 Glyptoactis
 Glyptostrobus
  †Gomphotaria – type locality for genus
 †Gomphotaria pugnax – type locality for species
  †Gomphotherium
 †Goniobasis – tentative report
 Goniopora
 Gopherus
 †Gopherus agassizii
 †Gordonia
 Granulina
 Gymnogyps
 †Gymnogyps californianus – type locality for species
 Gyroidina
 Haliaeetus
 †Haliaeetus leucocephalus
 †Haliaetus
 Haminoea
  †Harpagolestes – or unidentified comparable form
  Heloderma
 †Hemiauchenia
 †Hemiauchenia macrocephala
 Hemipristis
 †Hemipristis serra
 Hemitelia
 Hemitoma
 Here
 †Herpetocetus
  †Herpetotherium
 †Herpetotherium knighti – or unidentified comparable form
 Hespererato
 †Hespererato columbella
 †Hesperocamelus – or unidentified comparable form
 Hesperomys
 †Hesperotestudo
 Heterodontus
 Hexagrammos
 Hexanchus
 Hiatella
 †Hiatella arctica
 †Hiltonius
  †Hipparion
 †Hipparion forcei
  †Hippidion
 Hipponix
 †Hipponoe
 †Hippotherium
 Histrionicus
 †Histrionicus histrionicus – tentative report
 Hodomys
 Homalopoma
 Homo
 †Homo sapiens
  †Homotherium
 †Homotherium serum – or unidentified comparable form
 †Hoplophoneus
 †Hyaenodon
 †Hyaenodon venturae
 †Hyaenodon vetus – type locality for species
 Hyalina
 Hydrangea
 †Hydrodamalis
 †Hydrodamalis cuestae – type locality for species
  †Hydrodamalis gigas
 Hydrophilus
 Hyla
 †Hyopsodus – or unidentified comparable form
 †Hyperbaena
 †Hypertragulus
  †Hypohippus
 †Hypolagus
 †Hyrachyus
 †Ilingoceros
  †Imagotaria – type locality for genus
 †Imagotaria downsi – type locality for species
 †Indarctos
 †Inga
 †Ioscion
 Ischnochiton
 †Ischyrocyon
  †Ischyromys
 Isognomon
 Isurus
 †Isurus oxyrinchus
 †Isurus planus
 Jaton
 †Julus
 †Juncus
 Juniperus
 Kelletia
 †Kelletia kelletii
 Kellia
  †Kentriodon – type locality for genus
 †Keteleeria
 †Kingena
 Kurtzia
 †Kurtzia arteaga
 Kurtziella
 †Kurtziella plumbea
 †Labyrinthus
 Lacuna
 †Lacuna porrecta
 †Lacuna unifasciata
 †Lacunaria
 Laevicardium
 †Laevicardium elatum
 Lagena
 Lamna
 Lampanyctus
 †Lampris – type locality for genus
  †Lampris zatima – type locality for species
 Lampropeltis
 †Lampropeltis getulus
 Larus
  †Larus californicus
 †Larus delawarensis
 †Larus glaucescens
 †Larus philadelphia
 Latirus
 †Laytonia – type locality for genus
 Lechytia
 Leda
 Lepeta
 Lepidochitona
 Lepisosteus
 †Lepisosteus spatula – or unidentified comparable form
 †Leptacanthichthys
 †Leptacanthichthys gracilispinis
  †Leptocyon
  †Leptomeryx
 †Leptopecten latiauratus
 †Leptoreodon
 Lepus
 †Lepus americanus
 †Lepus californicus
 †Lepus callotis
 Leukoma
 †Leukoma staminea
 Lima
 Limaria
  †Limnocyon
 †Limosa
 †Limosa fedoa
 Linga
 †Linophryne
 †Linophryne indica
 †Liolithax – type locality for genus
 Liquidambar
 †Lirosceles
 Lirularia
 †Lirularia lirulata
  Lissodelphis – or unidentified comparable form
 †Lithocarpus
 Lithophaga
 Lithophyllum
  †Lithornis – or unidentified comparable form
 Lithothamnion
 Littorina
 †Littorina scutulata
 †Lompoquia – type locality for genus
 Lontra
 †Lontra canadensis
  †Lophar – type locality for genus
 †Lophocetus
 †Lophortyx
 †Lora
 Lottia
 †Lottia limatula
  †Lottia scabra
 Lucapinella
 †Lucapinella callomarginata
 Lucina
 Luidia
  †Lycophocyon – type locality for genus
 †Lycophocyon hutchisoni – type locality for species
 †Lygisma – type locality for genus
 Lygodium
 Lynx
 †Lynx rufus
 Lyonsia
 Lyria
  †Machairodus
 Macoma
 †Macoma nasuta
 Macrarene
 Macrocallista
  †Macrodelphinus – type locality for genus
 Madrepora
 Magnolia
 Mahonia
 Makaira
 Malea
 †Malea ringens
 Mallotus
 †Mammut
  †Mammut americanum
 †Mammut cosoensis
 †Mammut matthewi
 †Mammuthus
 †Mammuthus columbi
  †Mammuthus exilis
 †Mammuthus primigenius
 †Mancalla – type locality for genus
 †Mancalla californiensis – type locality for species
 †Mangelia
 Margarites
 †Margarites pupillus
 Marginella
  Marmota
 Martes
 Martesia
 Maxwellia
 †Maxwellia gemma
 †Mayena – tentative report
 †Mediochoerus
 †Megacamelus
  Megachasma
 Megachile
 †Megachile gentilis
 †Megahippus
  †Megalonyx
 †Megalonyx jeffersonii
 †Megalonyx wheatleyi
 Megalops – tentative report
 †Megapaloelodus
 Megaptera
 Megathura – tentative report
  †Megatylopus
 Melampus
 Melanella
 Melanitta
 †Melanitta deglandi – tentative report
 †Melanitta fusca
 †Melanitta perspicillata
 Melanoplus
 †Melanoplus differentialis
 Meleagris
 †Meliosma
 Melospiza
 †Melospiza melodia
 †Meniscotherium
  †Menoceras
 Mephitis
 †Mephitis mephitis
 Meretrix
 Mergus
 †Mergus serrator
 Merluccius
 †Merluccius productus
  †Merriamoceros
 †Merychippus
 †Merychyus
  †Merycodus
 Mesalia
 †Mesocyon
 †Mesodma – tentative report
 †Mesohippus
 Mesophyllum
  †Mesoreodon
 †Metalopex
 †Metarhinus
 †Metatomarctus
  †Metaxytherium
 †Miacis
 †Michenia
 †Microcosmodon – or unidentified comparable form
 Microdipodops
 Microgadus – tentative report
 †Microsyops
 †Microtomarctus
 Microtus
 †Microtus californicus
 †Miocryptorhopalum – type locality for genus
 †Miocyon
 †Miohippus
  †Miomancalla
 †Miotapirus
 †Miotylopus
  †Miracinonyx
 †Miracinonyx studeri – tentative report
 Mirounga
 †Mirounga angustirostris – or unidentified comparable form
 Mitra
 †Mitra fultoni
 †Mitra idae
 Mitrella
 †Mitrella carinata
 †Mixocetus – type locality for genus
 Modiolus
 †Modiolus capax – or unidentified comparable form
 Modulus
 Monoplex
 †Monoplex amictus
 †Monosaulax
 Montipora
 Mopalia
 †Mopalia ciliata
  †Moropus
 Morula
 Morus – or unidentified comparable form
 Morus
 Mulinia
 Murex – or unidentified related form
 Musculus
 Mustela
 †Mustela frenata
 †Mya
 †Mya truncata
  Myctophum
 Myliobatis
 †Myliobatis californicus
  †Mylohyus
 †Mylohyus fossilis
 †Mylopharodon
 †Mylopharodon conocephalus
 Myodes
 Mytilus
 †Mytilus californianus
 †Mytilus edulis
  Myurella
  †Nannippus
 †Nannocetus – type locality for genus
 †Nanotragulus
 Narona
 †Narona clavatula
 Nassa
  Nassarius
 †Nassarius fossatus
 Natica
 Naticarius
 †Navahoceros
 Nectandra
 Negaprion
 †Neobernaya
 †Neobernaya spadicea
 †Neogyps
 †Neogyps errans
  †Neohipparion
 †Neoliotomus – or unidentified comparable form
 †Neolitsea
  †Neoparadoxia – type locality for genus
 †Neoparadoxia cecilialina – type locality for species
 †Neoparadoxia repenningi – type locality for species
  Neophrontops
 †Neophrontops americanus
 †Neoplagiaulax
 Neotamias
 †Neotamias senex
 †Neotherium – type locality for genus
 Neotoma
 †Neotoma cinerea – type locality for species
 †Neotoma fuscipes
 †Neotoma lepida
 Neptunea
 Nerita
 Neritina
 †Nerium
 Neverita
 Nicrophorus
 †Nicrophorus guttula
 †Nicrophorus marginatus – type locality for species
 †Nicrophorus nigrita
 †Nimravides
  †Nimravus
 Niso – tentative report
 †Nitzschia
 Nodipecten
 †Nodipecten subnodosus
 Norrisia
 †Norrisia norrisi
  †Nothrotheriops
 †Nothrotherium
 Notiosorex
 †Notiosorex crawfordi
 Notoacmea
  Notorhynchus
 †Nototamias
 Nucella
 †Nucella emarginata
 †Nucella lamellosa
 †Nucella lima
 Nucula
 Numenius
  †Numenius phaeopus
 Nuttallia
 †Nyssa
 Oceanodroma
  †Oceanodroma furcata
 †Oceanodroma homochroa
 Ocenebra
 Ocotea
 †Ocystias
 †Odaxosaurus
 Odobenus
  †Odobenus rosmarus
  Odocoileus
 †Odocoileus hemionus
 †Odocoileus virginianus – or unidentified comparable form
 Odontaspis
 †Odontaspis ferox
 Odostomia
 †Odostomia avellana
 †Odostomia beringi – or unidentified comparable form
 †Odostomia californica – or unidentified comparable form
 †Odostomia callimene – or unidentified related form
 †Odostomia columbiana – or unidentified comparable form
  †Odostomia donilla
 †Odostomia eugena
 †Odostomia farallonensis
 †Odostomia fetella
 †Odostomia gravida
 †Odostomia helena
 †Odostomia minutissima – or unidentified comparable form
 †Odostomia nemo
 †Odostomia nota
 †Odostomia stephensae
 †Odostomia tenuisculpta – or unidentified comparable form
 Oenopota
 †Oenopota tabulata
 Oliva
 †Oliva spicata
 Olivella
 †Olivella baetica
  †Olivella biplicata
 †Olivella gracilis
 †Olivella pedroana
 Oncorhynchus
  †Oncorhynchus rastrosus
 Ondatra
  Oneirodes
 Onthophagus
 Onychomys
 †Onychomys torridus
 Ophiodermella
 †Ophiodermella inermis
 †Opisthonema
 Oreamnos
 †Oreamnos americanus
 Oreortyx
 †Oreortyx picta
 Orthemis
 †Orthemis ferruginea
 Orthodon
 †Osbornodon
  †Osteodontornis – type locality for genus
 †Osteodontornis orri – type locality for species
 Ostrea
 †Ostrea conchaphila
 †Ostrea lurida
  †Otodus
 †Otodus megalodon
 Otus
 †Otus asio
 Ovibos
 †Ovibos moschatus
 Ovis
 †Ovis canadensis
 †Oxyrhina
 †Oxyura
 †Oxyura jamaicensis
 †Ozymandias – type locality for genus
 †Pacifichelys
 †Palaeolagus
  †Paleoparadoxia
 †Paleoparadoxia tabatai
 Pandora
 Panopea
 †Panopea abrupta
 Panthera
  †Panthera leo
 †Panthera onca – or unidentified comparable form
 †Parabalaenoptera – type locality for genus
 †Parabalaenoptera baulinensis – type locality for species
 †Paracynarctus
 †Parahippus
 Paralichthys – type locality for genus
  †Paramylodon
 †Paramylodon harlani
 †Paramys
  †Parapontoporia
 †Parapontoporia sternbergi – type locality for species
 †Parastylotermes
 †Parastylotermes calico – type locality for species
 †Parastylotermes frazieri – type locality for species
 †Paratomarctus
  †Parietobalaena
 †Paronychomys
 †Parribacus
 Patelloida
 Pecten
 †Pedalion
 †Pediomeryx
 †Pelagiarctos – type locality for genus
 †Pelagiarctos thomasi – type locality for species
  †Pelagornis
 Pelecanus
 †Pelecanus erythrorhynchus – or unidentified comparable form
 †Pelecanus occidentalis
  †Peltosaurus
 †Peraceras
 Perognathus
 Peromyscus
 †Peromyscus truei – or unidentified comparable form
 †Perse
 Persea
 Persististrombus
 Petricola
 Phalacrocorax
 †Phalacrocorax auritus
 †Phalacrocorax pelagicus
 †Phalacrocorax penicillatus
 Phalaropus
 †Phalaropus fulicaria
 †Phalaropus lobatus
 †Phanaeus
  †Phlaocyon
 Phloeodes
 †Phloeodes diabolicus
 †Phloeodes plicatus
 †Phoberogale
 Phoca
 †Phoca vitulina – or unidentified comparable form
 Phocoena – or unidentified comparable form
 †Phoebastria
 †Phoebastria albatrus – type locality for species
  Phoenicopterus – or unidentified comparable form
 Pholadidea
 Pholadomya
 Pholas
 Phos
 †Photinia
  Phrynosoma
 Phyllonotus
 Physa
 Picea
 Pinna
 Pinus
 †Pinus muricata
 †Pinus radiata
 Piranga
 †Piranga ludoviciana
 Pitar
 Pituophis
 †Pituophis melanoleucus
 Pitymys
 Platanus
  †Platygonus
 Platynus
 Plegadis
 †Plegadis chihi
 †Pleiolama
  †Plesiadapis
 †Plesiogulo
 Pleurofusia
 †Pleuroncodes
 †Pleuronichthys
 †Pliauchenia
 †Pliocyon
 †Pliohippus
 †Pliometanastes
 †Plionarctos
  †Pliopedia – type locality for genus
 †Pliopedia pacifica – type locality for species
  †Plithocyon
 Pluvialis
 †Pluvialis squatarola
 †Poabromylus – tentative report
 Pocillopora
 Podiceps
 †Podiceps auritus
 Podilymbus
 †Podilymbus podiceps
 Pododesmus
 †Pododesmus macrochisma
 †Poebrodon
 †Poebrodon californicus – type locality for species
  †Pogonodon
 Polinices
 †Polinices lewisii
 Polydora
 Polymesoda
 Polystira
 †Pongamia
 †Pontolis – or unidentified comparable form
 †Pontolis magnus
 Populus
 Porichthys
  †Porichthys notatus
 Porites
 †Portunites
 †Potamides
 †Praemancalla – type locality for genus
 Priene
 Prionace
 †Prionace glauca
 †Pristichampsus
 Pristiophorus
  †Procamelus
 †Procynodictis
 Procyon
 †Procyon lotor
 †Promartes
 †Protanthias – type locality for genus
 †Protepicyon
  †Protitanops
 †Protohepialus – type locality for genus
 †Protohepialus comstocki – type locality for species
 †Protolabis
 †Protomarctus
 †Protostrix
 Protothaca
  †Protylopus
 Prunus
  †Psephophorus
 †Pseudaelurus
 Pseudochama
 Pseudoliva
 Pseudomelatoma
 †Pseudomelatoma penicillata
 †Pseudoseriola – type locality for genus
 †Pseudotsuga
 Pteria
 †Pteroplatea
 Pteropurpura
 †Pteropurpura festiva
 Pterostichus
 Pterynotus
  †Ptilodus
 Ptinus
 Ptychoramphus
 †Ptychoramphus aleuticus
 Puffinus
 †Puffinus griseus
 †Puffinus opisthomelas
  †Puffinus tenuirostris
  †Puma
 †Puma concolor – type locality for species
 Puncturella
 †Puncturella galeata
 Purpura
 Pusula
  Pycnodonte
 Pyramidella
 †Pyramidella adamsi – or unidentified comparable form
 Pyrene
 Quercus
 Raja
 Rallus
 †Rallus limicola
 †Ramoceros
 †Raja
 Rallus
 †Rallus limicola
  †Ramoceros
 †Rana
 Rapana
 Recurvirostra
 Reithrodontomys
 †Repomys
  Reticulitermes
 Reticutriton
 Retusa
 †Rhabdammina
 †Rhamnidium
 †Rhamnus
 Rhus
  †Rhynchotherium
 †Rhythmias
 Rimella
 Rissa
 †Rissa tridactyla
 Rissoina
 †Robinia
 †Rotularia
 Sabal
 Sagmatias
 Salix
  †Saniwa
 †Saniwa ensidens – type locality for species
 †Sapindus
 †Sarda
 Sassia
 Saxidomus
 †Saxidomus gigantea
 †Saxidomus nuttalli
  †Scaldicetus
 Scapanus
 †Scapanus latimanus
 Scaphander
 Scapharca
 Scaphinotus
 †Scaphinotus interruptus
  †Scaphohippus
 Sceloporus
 †Sceloporus occidentalis
 †Schistomerus – type locality for genus
 †Schistomerus californense – type locality for species
 Schizaster
 Sciurus
 Scomber
 †Scomberesox
  Scopelogadus
 †Scutella
 Scyliorhinus
 †Scymnorhinus
 †Sebastodes
 Seila
 Semele – tentative report
 Semele
 Semicassis
 Semicossyphus
  †Semirostrum – type locality for genus
 †Semirostrum ceruttii – type locality for species
  †Sequoiadendron
 †Serbelodon
 Serica
 Seriola
 Seriphus
 †Seriphus politus
 Serpula
 Serpulorbis
  †Sespia
 Siderastrea
 Sigmodon
 Sigmoilina – tentative report
 Siliqua
  †Siliqua patula – or unidentified related form
 Sinum
 Siphonalia
 Skenea
 †Skenea californica
 †Smilax
  †Smilodon
 †Smilodon fatalis
 †Smilodon gracilis
 †Smilodonichthys
 Solariella
 †Solariella peramabilis
 Solemya
 Solen
 Solenosteira
 Sorex
 Spermophilus
  †Spermophilus beecheyi
 †Spermophilus lateralis
 Sphyrna
 Spilogale
 †Spilogale putorius
 Spirotropis
 Spisula
 Spondylus
 Squalus
 Squatina
 †Squatina californica – or unidentified comparable form
 Squilla
  †Stegomastodon
 †Stegomastodon mirificus – or unidentified comparable form
 Stenella
  †Stenomylus
 †Stenomylus hitchcocki – or unidentified comparable form
 Stenoplax
 †Stenoplax conspicua
 Stercorarius
 Sterna
 †Sternbergia – type locality for genus
 Sthenictis
 †Stictocarbo
  †Stockoceros – or unidentified comparable form
 Stomias
 Stramonita
 †Stramonita biserialis
 †Stramonita canaliculata
 †Striatolamia
 Strioterebrum
 Strombiformis
 Strombus
 †Strombus galeatus
 †Strombus gracilior
 Strongylocentrotus
 †Strongylodon
 Sturnella
  †Stylemys
 Subcancilla
 †Subcancilla sulcata
  †Subhyracodon
 Succinea
 Sula
 †Syllomus – or unidentified comparable form
 Sylvilagus
 †Sylvilagus audubonii
 †Sylvilagus bachmani
 †Sylvilagus floridanus
  Syngnathus
 Synthliboramphus
 †Synthliboramphus antiquus
 †Synthliboramphus hypoleucus
 †Tabernaemontana
 Tadorna
 †Tadorna tadorna
 Tagelus
 †Tagelus californianus
 †Tagelus subteres
 Tamias
 Tamiasciurus
 †Tamiasciurus hudsonicus
 †Tanymykter
  Tapirus
 †Tapirus californicus
 †Tapirus merriami – type locality for species
  †Tapocyon
 Taranis
 Taricha
 Taxidea
 †Taxidea taxus
 Tayassu
 Tegula
 †Tegula aureotincta
 †Tegula eiseni
 †Tegula ligulata
  †Teleoceras
 Tellina
 †Temnocyon
 Tenagodus
  †Teratornis
 †Teratornis merriami
 Terebellum
 Terebra
 †Terebra pedroana
 †Terebra protexta
 Terebratula
 Teredo
 Terminalia
 †Tessarolax – tentative report
 Testudo
 †Tetraclaenodon
 †Tetrameryx
 Thais
  †Thalassoleon
 †Thalassoleon macnallyae – type locality for species
 †Thalassoleon mexicanus
 †Thamnasteria
 Thamnophis
 Thomomys
 †Thomomys bottae
 †Thomomys monticola
 Thracia
 Thunnus – type locality for genus
 Thyasira
 †Thyrsites
 †Ticholeptus
 Timoclea
  †Titanotylopus
 Tivela
 †Tivela stultorum
  †Tomarctus
 †Tomarctus brevirostris
 †Tomarctus hippophaga
 Totanus
 †Toxicodendron
 Toxopneustes
 †Toxopneustes roseus – or unidentified comparable form
 Toxostoma
 †Toxostoma redivivum
 Trachycardium
  Tremarctos
 †Tremarctos floridanus
 Tresus
 †Tresus capax
 †Tresus nuttallii
 Triakis – tentative report
 Trichotropis
 Tricolia
 †Tricolia pulloides
 †Trigonictis macrodon
 Trionyx
 Triphora
  Triplofusus
 †Triplofusus princeps
 Trochita
  †Trogosus
 Trophon
 Tucetona
 †Tucetona multicostata
 †Tunita – type locality for genus
 Turbonilla
 †Turbonilla aepynota
 †Turbonilla almo
 †Turbonilla asser
 †Turbonilla canfieldi
 †Turbonilla carpenteri
  †Turbonilla laminata
 †Turbonilla pentalopha
 †Turbonilla raymondi
 †Turbonilla regina
 †Turbonilla stylina
 †Turbonilla tenuicula
 †Turbonilla torquata
 †Turbonilla tridentata
 †Turbonilla weldi
  Turcica
 †Turcica caffea
 Turdus
 †Turio
 Turricula
  Turris
 Turritella
 Turritriton
 †Turritriton gibbosus
  Tursiops – or unidentified comparable form
 Typha
 Typhis
 Tyto
 †Tyto alba
 Uca
  †Uintatherium
 Ulmus
 †Umbellularia
 Uria
 †Uria aalge
 †Urobatis
 †Urobatis halleri
 †Urocitellus
 †Urocitellus beldingi
 Urocyon
 †Urocyon cinereoargenteus
 Urolophus
 †Urolophus halleri – tentative report
 Ursus
  †Ursus americanus
 †Ustatochoerus
 Uta
 †Uta stansburiana
 †Valenictus – type locality for genus
 †Valenictus chulavistensis – type locality for species
 †Valenictus imperialensis – type locality for species
 †Vanderhoofius
 Vasum
 †Vauquelinia
  †Velates
 Velutina
 †Velutina velutina
 Venericardia
 Venus
 Vermicularia
 Veromessor
  †Viburnum
 †Vireo
 Vitrinella – tentative report
 Volsella
 Voluta
 Volutopsius
 †Vouapa
 Vulpes
 †Vulpes cascadensis
 †Vulpes velox
 Williamia
 †Wodnika
  Xenophora
 †Xyne – type locality for genus
 Yoldia
 †Yoldia cooperii
 †Yumaceras – tentative report
 †Zachrysia
 Zalophus
 †Zalophus californianus
  †Zamites
 †Zaphleges
 †Zaphleges longurio
 †Zapteryx
 †Zarhinocetus
 †Zarhinocetus errabundus – type locality for species
 Zelkova
 Zenaida
 †Zenaida macroura
 Zonotrichia
 †Zonotrichia leucophrys
  †Zygolophodon

References
 

California